Josiah S. Little (July 9, 1801 - April 2, 1862) was an American politician from Maine. Little was the 39th Speaker of the Maine House of Representatives. He was speaker in 1841 both and 1856. In 1841, Little was elected as a Whig and as a Democrat in 1856. He was from Portland, Maine.

References

1801 births
1862 deaths
Speakers of the Maine House of Representatives
Democratic Party members of the Maine House of Representatives
Politicians from Portland, Maine
Maine Whigs
19th-century American politicians